The 71st Operations Group (71 OG) is the operational flying component of the United States Air Force 71st Flying Training Wing. It is stationed at Vance Air Force Base, Oklahoma.

The group's World War II predecessor unit, the 71st Reconnaissance Group operated primarily in the Southwest Pacific Theater flying reconnaissance missions over New Guinea, New Britain, and the Admiralty Islands to provide target and damage-assessment photographs for air force units, It also bombed and strafed Japanese installation and shipping, supported Allied forces on New Guinea and Biak, flew courier missions, participated in rescue operations, and hauled passengers and cargo. The group moved to the Philippines in November 1944 and flew reconnaissance missions over Luzon to provide information for US forces on Japanese troops movements, gun positions, and supply routes. It was awarded the Philippine Presidential Unit Citation for its role in the liberation of the Philippines during 1944–1945. During the postwar years, the unit remained in the Far East and photographed areas of Japan and South Korea, which in 1950, provided much of the initial intelligence of the area when the Korean War broke out.

Major William A. Shomo of the 71st Reconnaissance Group awarded the Medal of Honor for his actions on 11 January 1945 sighting a formation of thirteen Japanese aircraft while leading 3 two-plane flight, Maj. Shomo attacked the superior enemy force and destroyed seven planes.

Overview
The 71 OG conducts joint specialized undergraduate pilot training for over 410 U.S. Air Force, Navy, Marine Corps, and allied student pilots each year. The group utilizes over 200 T-6, T-1, T-38, and A T-38 aircraft, flies more than 55,000 sorties annually, and logs over 81,000 flying hours each year.

 3rd Flying Training Squadron, T-1 Jayhawk
 5th Flying Training Squadron, T-6A Texan II, T-1 Jayhawk, and T-38 Talon
 8th Flying Training Squadron, T-6A Texan II
 25th Flying Training Squadron, T-38 Talon
 33rd Flying Training Squadron, T-6A Texan II
 71st Operations Support Squadron

History
 For additional lineage and history, see 71st Flying Training Wing
The 71st Observation Group trained with B-25, P-38, and P-40 aircraft beginning in October 1941. It moved to California in December 1941 and flew antisubmarine patrols off the west coast, then moved to the Southwest Pacific in the fall of 1943 and flew reconnaissance missions over New Britain, New Guinea, and the Admiralty Islands from bases in New Guinea and Biak. It also flew combat mission against Japanese installations, airfields, and shipping, while supporting Allied ground forces on New Guinea and Biak. During that time, it flew courier missions, participated in rescue operations, and hauled passengers and cargo. From November 1944, the group flew reconnaissance missions over Luzon, supported ground forces, photographed and bombed airfields in Formosa and China, and attacked enemy shipping in the South China Sea.

Maj William A. Shomo earned the Congressional Medal of Honor for shooting down seven enemy aircraft on 11 January 1945. From Ie Shima in August 1945, the 71st attacked transportation targets on Kyushu and flew reconnaissance missions over southern Japan.

From February 1947 to August 1948, the group, equipped with reconnaissance aircraft, flew aerial photographing missions over Japan and southern Korea.

In December 1991, the 71st Operations Group assumed operational control over the 71st Flying Training Wing's T-37, T-38, and later T-1A aircraft, and provided undergraduate pilot training for USAF, Air National Guard, Air Force Reserve, and allied countries. The group provided initial flight training, and follow-on training for fighter, bomber and airlift/tanker aircraft.

Lineage
 Established as 71st Observation Group on 21 August 1941
 Activated on 1 October 1941
 Redesignated: 71st Reconnaissance Group on 2 April 1943
 Redesignated: 71st Tactical Reconnaissance Group on 10 May 1944
 Redesignated: 71st Reconnaissance Group on 20 May 1945
 Inactivated on 1 February 1946
 Activated on 28 February 1947
 Redesignated: 71st Tactical Reconnaissance Group on 18 August 1948
 Inactivated on 1 April 1949
 Redesignated 71t Operations Group on 9 December 1991
 Activated on 15 December 1991.

Assignments
 II Air Support Command, 1 October 1941
 IV Air Support (later, IV Ground Air Support) Command, March 1942
 II Air Support Command (later, II Tactical Air Division), August 1942
 V Bomber Command, November 1943
 5212 Photographic Reconnaissance Wing (Provisional), 1 March 1944
 Fifth Air Force, 12 April 1944
 91st Photographic Wing, Reconnaissance, 1 May 1944
 Attached to: 310th Bombardment Wing, 9 January – 29 May 1945
 Attached to: 309th Bombardment Wing, 29 May – 25 September 1945
 Attached to: 310th Bombardment Wing, 25 September – 10 November 1945
 Fifth Air Force, 10 November 1945 – 1 February 1946
 315th Composite Wing, 28 February 1947
 314th Composite Wing, 15 April 1947
 71st Tactical Reconnaissance Wing, 18 August 1948 – 1 April 1949
 71st Flying Training Wing, 15 December 1991–present

Components
 3d Flying Training Squadron: c. April 2007-present
 7th Flying Training Squadron: 15 December 1991 – 1 October 1992
 8th Photo Reconnaissance (later, 8th Tactical Reconnaissance; 8th Flying Training) Squadron: 28 February 1947 – 1 April 1949; 15 December 1991–present
 17th Observation (later, 17th Reconnaissance) Squadron: 26 February 1942 – 1 February 1946
 25th Observation (later, 25 Liaison) Squadron: 29 March 1942 – 16 February 1945
 25th Tactical Reconnaissance (later 25th Flying Training) Squadron: 28 February 1947 – 1 April 1949; 15 December 1991–present
 26th Flying Training Squadron: 15 December 1991 – 1 October 1992
 31st Reconnaissance Squadron: attached, 27 October 1947 – 1 April 1949
 32d Flying Training Squadron: 1 June 1995 – 14 September 2012
 33d Flying Training Squadron: 1 October 1998-present
 82d Observation (later, 82d Reconnaissance; 82d Tactical Reconnaissance) Squadron: 5 April 1942 – 1 February 1946; 28 February 1947 – 1 April 1949
 102d Observation Squadron: 1 October 1941 – 29 March 1942
 110th Observation (later, 110th Reconnaissance; 110th Tactical Reconnaissance) Squadron: 1 October 1941 – 20 October 1945
 128th Observation Squadron: 1 October 1941-c. April 1942
 Flying Training Squadron Provisional, 26: 1 October 1994 – 1 June 1995.

Stations

 Birmingham Army Airfield, Alabama, 1 October 1941
 Salinas Army Air Base, California, 21 December 1941
 Rice Army Airfield, California, 18 August 1942
 Salinas Army Air Base, California, 19 October 1942
 Esler Field, Louisiana, 24 January 1943
 Laurel Army Airfield, Mississippi, 31 March – 24 September 1943
 Port Moresby Airfield Complex, New Guinea, 7 November 1943
 Nadzab Airfield Complex, New Guinea, 20 January 1944
 Mokmer Airfield, Biak, Netherlands East Indies, 8 August 1944
 Undetermined Locations, Leyte, Philippines, 5 November 1944

 Binmaley Airstrip, Luzon, Philippines, 2 February 1945
 Ie Shima Airfield, Okinawa, August 1945
 Chofu Airfield, Japan, 6 October 1945
 Tachikawa Airfield, Japan, 23 October 1945
 Irumagawa Air Base, Japan, c. 15 January – 1 February 1946
 Itami Air Base, Japan, 28 February 1947
 Johnson Air Base, Japan, 15 April 1947
 Yokota Air Base, Japan, 31 October 1947 – 1 April 1949
 Vance AFB, Oklahoma, 15 December 1991 – present

Aircraft

 O-38, 1941
 O-46, 1941–1942
 O-47, 1941–1942
 O-49 1941–1942
 O-52, 1941–1942
 L-2, 1941–1942
 A-20, 1942–1943
 F-5, 1942–1946
 P-38, 1942–1946
 B-25, 1942–1946
 L-5, 1943–1945
 L-4, 1944

 UC-61, 1944
 UC-78, 1944–1945
 F-6, 1945–1946
 P-39, 1942–1944
 P-40, 1942–1945
 P-51, 1946–1947
 F-15, 1947–1949
 F-2, 1947–1948
 RF-61, 1949
 T-37, 1991–2008
 T-6, 2007–present
 T-38, 1991–present
 T-1, 1994–present

References

 71st Operations Group Factsheet

External links

071